The 1994 Saxony-Anhalt state election was held on 26 June 1994 to elect the members of the 2nd Landtag of Saxony-Anhalt. The incumbent government of the Christian Democratic Union (CDU) and Free Democratic Party (FDP) led by Minister-President Christoph Bergner was defeated. The FDP suffered a 10-point swing and lost its seats in the Landtag, while the CDU narrowly remained the largest party with 34.4% of votes. After the election, the Social Democratic Party (SPD) formed a minority government with The Greens, tolerated by the Party of Democratic Socialism (PDS). This new government became known as the "Magdeburg model".

Parties
The table below lists parties represented in the 1st Landtag of Saxony-Anhalt.

Election result

|-
! colspan="2" | Party
! Votes
! %
! +/-
! Seats 
! +/-
! Seats %
|-
| bgcolor=| 
| align=left | Christian Democratic Union (CDU)
| align=right| 390,077
| align=right| 34.4
| align=right| 4.6
| align=right| 37
| align=right| 11
| align=right| 37.4
|-
| bgcolor=| 
| align=left | Social Democratic Party (SPD)
| align=right| 386,020
| align=right| 34.0
| align=right| 8.0
| align=right| 36
| align=right| 9
| align=right| 36.4
|-
| bgcolor=| 
| align=left | Party of Democratic Socialism (PDS)
| align=right| 225,243
| align=right| 19.9
| align=right| 7.9
| align=right| 21
| align=right| 9
| align=right| 21.2
|-
| bgcolor=| 
| align=left | Alliance 90/The Greens (Grüne)
| align=right| 57,739
| align=right| 5.1
| align=right| 0.2
| align=right| 5
| align=right| ±0
| align=right| 5.1
|-
! colspan=8|
|-
| bgcolor=| 
| align=left | Free Democratic Party (FDP)
| align=right| 40,560
| align=right| 3.6
| align=right| 9.9
| align=right| 0
| align=right| 14
| align=right| 0
|-
| bgcolor=| 
| align=left | The Republicans (REP)
| align=right| 15,478
| align=right| 1.4
| align=right| 0.8
| align=right| 0
| align=right| ±0
| align=right| 0
|-
| bgcolor=|
| align=left | Others
| align=right| 19,313
| align=right| 1.7
| align=right| 
| align=right| 0
| align=right| ±0
| align=right| 0
|-
! align=right colspan=2| Total
! align=right| 1,134,430
! align=right| 100.0
! align=right| 
! align=right| 99
! align=right| 7
! align=right| 
|-
! align=right colspan=2| Voter turnout
! align=right| 
! align=right| 54.8
! align=right| 10.3
! align=right| 
! align=right| 
! align=right| 
|}

Sources
 Landtagswahl 1994 

1994
1994 elections in Germany